Cəfərbəyli (also, Jafarbeyli) is a village and municipality in the Aghjabadi District of Azerbaijan.  It has a population of 750.

References 

Populated places in Aghjabadi District